Qiantu Motor is a Chinese automobile manufacturer. It is headquartered in Suzhou. It specializes in designing and developing electric vehicles.

Founder 
The company chairman, Lu Qun graduated from Tsinghua University in 1990. He later worked as an engineer at Beijing Jeep Automobile Co., Ltd. He became an engine test engineer and product plan section chief as well as product engineering manager and other positions, and later became a company executive.  

In 2003, thirteen years after joining Beijing Jeep, Lu Qun resigned.

After leaving Beijing Jeep, Lu Qun and his partners established the Beijing Great Wall Huaguan Automobile Technology Co., Ltd.

Timeline 
In 2010, the Electric Vehicle Division of Beijing Great Wall Huaguan Automobile Technology Co., Ltd. was officially established.

In 2014, Great Wall Huaguan's first concept and prototype cars were built. It was named the K50. Its small dragonfly logo means that the Qiantu K50 will be as light, small and quiet as a dragonfly.

The Qiantu K50 debuted during the 2015 Shanghai Auto Show. The K50 is a pioneer in electric sports car manufacturing for China. Its body is made of carbon fiber. After the auto show, the company improved the K50, and after undergoing crash, durability, performance and other tests, Qiantu also developed an ESP system exclusively for the K50 to ensure safety. Maneuverability was also improved. Qiantu cooperated with instrument panel supplier IAC to develop the interior panels of the vehicle.

During the 2016 Beijing Auto Show,the K50 was exhibited as a convertible version and a pre-production version. Six months later, the National Development and Reform Commission approved the project. In 2017, Qiantu Auto made a debut at the auto show with a three-car lineup.

During the 2018 Beijing Auto Show, Qiantu Auto brought the K50 and two new concept cars, the K20 and Concept 1 to the show.

On June 30, 2018, the Qiantu K50 entered mass production, and more than a month later the first batch of K50 was delivered.

In June 2022, the Qiantu K20 is introduced.

Vehicles 
Qiantu K50
Qiantu K20
Qiantu K50 Spyder Concept
Qiantu K25 Concept
Qiantu Concept 1
Qiantu Concept 2

See also
 Tesla, Inc.
 Faraday Future
 Lucid Motors
 Fisker Inc.
 Karma Automotive
 HiPhi
 Nio
 Byton
 Li Auto
 Xpeng
 WM Motors

References

External links 

Electric vehicle manufacturers of China
Car brands
Car manufacturers of China
Vehicle manufacturing companies established in 2016
Chinese companies established in 2016
Chinese brands
Luxury motor vehicle manufacturers